Marco Stiepermann (born 9 February 1991) is a German professional footballer who plays as an attacking midfielder for Regionalliga West club Wuppertaler SV.

Career

Borussia Dortmund
Stiepermann began his career 1998 in the youth of Borussia Dortmund and was in the 2008–09 season promoted to the reserve team. He earned his first professional cap for Borussia Dortmund in the Bundesliga against VfL Wolfsburg on 13 December 2009 and scored in the return match on 1 May 2010 his first Bundesliga goal against VfL Wolfsburg.

Alemannia Aachen
On 24 May 2011, Stiepermann joined Alemannia Aachen on loan until the end of the 2011–12 season.

Energie Cottbus
On 29 May 2012, Stiepermann moved to Energie Cottbus, signed a contract until June 2015. The transfer fee was believed to be €200,000.

Greuther Fürth
After Cottbus were relegated from the 2. Bundesliga at the end of the 2013–14 season, Stiepermann used a release clause to leave the club on a free transfer. He signed a three-year contract with fellow 2. Bundesliga club SpVgg Greuther Fürth.

VfL Bochum
On 16 June 2016, Stiepermann joined VfL Bochum.

Norwich City
On 6 August 2017, Stiepermann joined Championship club Norwich City on a three-year deal for an undisclosed fee.

Stiepermann had a troubled first season in England, moved out to play left-back for much of the season before a Hernia prematurely ended his first term with Norwich.

After rumors of a potential return to Germany before the 2018/19 season, Stiepermann played a crucial role in Norwich's surprise Championship winning season; contributing with 10 goals and 8 assists as he returned to his preferred attacking midfielder position.

In May 2019, he signed a new three-year contract but a disappointing season in the Premier League followed as Norwich were instantly relegated back to the Championship.

During Norwich’s title-winning 2020/21 EFL Championship season, Stiepermann played a very limited part. This was due to illness as well as the permanent signing of Kieran Dowell from Everton, who was preferred in the attacking midfield role. On 1 July 2021, it was announced that Stiepermann’s contract with the club had been cancelled by mutual consent.

SC Paderborn
On 17 August 2021, Stiepermann returned to Germany, signing a one-year deal with SC Paderborn.

Wuppertaler SV
In summer 2022, Stiepermann joined Regionalliga West club Wuppertaler SV.

Career statistics

Honours
Norwich City
EFL Championship: 2018–19, 2020–21

References

1991 births
Living people
German footballers
Germany youth international footballers
Association football midfielders
Footballers from Dortmund
Bundesliga players
2. Bundesliga players
3. Liga players
Regionalliga players
Borussia Dortmund II players
Borussia Dortmund players
Alemannia Aachen players
FC Energie Cottbus players
FC Energie Cottbus II players
SpVgg Greuther Fürth players
VfL Bochum players
Norwich City F.C. players
SC Paderborn 07 players
Wuppertaler SV players
German expatriate footballers
Expatriate footballers in England
English Football League players
German expatriate sportspeople in England
Premier League players